Meconella oregana, the white fairypoppy, is a plant species native to Oregon, California, Washington and British Columbia. It grows on sandy bluffs, meadows and stream banks, at elevations of less than 300 m (1000 feet).

Meconella oregana is a small herb up to  16 cm (40 inches) tall. It has narrow, linear leaves up to 18 mm (0.7 inches) long. Flowers are solitary on long, thin stalks, white with 4-6 stamens (compared with 8-12 stamens in M. californica).

References

Papaveroideae
Flora of British Columbia
Flora of California
Flora of Oregon
Flora of Washington (state)
Endangered flora of the United States
Taxa named by Thomas Nuttall
Plants described in 1838